South Center is an unincorporated community in Union Township, LaPorte County, Indiana.

Geography

References

Unincorporated communities in LaPorte County, Indiana
Unincorporated communities in Indiana